Cancrinite is a complex carbonate and silicate of sodium, calcium and aluminium with the formula Na6Ca2[(CO3)2|Al6Si6O24]·2H2O. It is classed as a member of the feldspathoid group of minerals; the alkali feldspars that are poor in silica. Yellow, orange, pink, white or even blue, it has a vitreous or pearly luster; a hardness of 5–6 and an uneven conchoidal fracture. It is unusual among the silicate minerals in that it will effervesce with hydrochloric acid due to the associated carbonate ions.

Found originally in 1839 in the Ural Mountains, it is named after Georg von Cancrin, a Russian minister of finance.

References 

Calcium minerals
Sodium minerals
Aluminium minerals
Carbonate minerals
Cancrinite group
Hexagonal minerals
Minerals in space group 173